Verapaz is a municipality in the San Vincente department of El Salvador. Verapaz means 'true peace' (from Spanish 'verdadera' [true] and 'paz' [peace]). It has been the site of two recent natural disasters; an earthquake measuring 6.6 on the Moment magnitude scale on 13 February 2001 and the 2009 Salvador floods and mudslides in November 2009.

References

Municipalities of the San Vicente Department